Jiang Lifu (4 July 1890 – 3 February 1978) was a Chinese mathematician and educator widely regarded as the Father of modern Chinese mathematics. His main research areas are the theory of syringine geometry and matrix.

Life
Born in 1890 during the late Qing Dynasty, Jiang Lifu was a native of Pingyang County in Wenzhou.

He received a Bachelor of Science degree from the University of California in May 1915 and entered Harvard University in 1916, where he obtained his second degree there in 1919.

In 1920, he founded the Department of Studies at Nankai University and was the only teacher teaching in that department. It was also stated by many of his former students that his teaching was very strict. In 1934, Jiang went to the University of Hamburg and the University of Göttingen. During World War II, he went to teach at the war-time formed National Southwestern Associated University, and was selected to be the new mathematics society chairman.

Family
Jiang Lifu had a son, Jiang Boju, who is a professor of mathematics at Peking University.

References

1890 births
1978 deaths
Mathematicians from Zhejiang
Harvard University alumni
University of California alumni
Academic staff of the National Southwestern Associated University
Academic staff of Nankai University
Scientists from Wenzhou
Academic staff of Sun Yat-sen University
Educators from Wenzhou